Parker F. Dunn (August 8, 1890 – October 23, 1918) was an American soldier serving in the United States Army during World War I who received the Medal of Honor for bravery.

Biography
Dunn was born in Albany, New York and after enlisting in the United States Army was sent to France to fight in World War I.

He died on October 23, 1918, and is buried in St. Agnes Cemetery, Menands New York. His grave can be located in section 16, lot 69.

The Dunn Memorial Bridge, current bridge of that name built in 1969, is named in his honor.

Medal of Honor Citation
Rank and organization: Private First Class, U.S. Army, Company A, 312th Infantry, 78th Division. Place and date: Near Grand-Pre, France, 23 October 1918. Entered service at: Albany, N.Y. Birth: Albany, N.Y. General Orders: War Department, General Orders No. 49, November 25, 1922.

Citation:

When his battalion commander found it necessary to send a message to a company in the attacking line and hesitated to order a runner to make the trip because of the extreme danger involved, Pfc. Dunn, a member of the intelligence section, volunteered for the mission. After advancing but a short distance across a field swept by artillery and machinegun fire, he was wounded, but continued on and fell wounded a second time. Still undaunted, he persistently attempted to carry out his mission until he was killed by a machinegun bullet before reaching the advance line.

Military Awards 
Dunn's military decorations and awards include:

See also

List of Medal of Honor recipients for World War I

References

1890 births
1918 deaths
Military personnel from Albany, New York
United States Army Medal of Honor recipients
United States Army soldiers
American military personnel killed in World War I
Burials at St. Agnes Cemetery
World War I recipients of the Medal of Honor
United States Army personnel of World War I